The Times-Journal is a weekly newspaper based in Russell Springs, Kentucky, and serving Russell County. Owned by Russell County Newspaper, LLC, and operated by Jobe Publishing, Inc., it is a sister newspaper to The Russell County News-Register.

References

External links 
Official website 
Jobe Publishing, Inc.
Russell County Times-Journal on Facebook 

Times-Journal